Vicoforte is a comune in the Province of Cuneo in Italy.

It is known mainly for the Santuario di Vicoforte, built between 1596 and 1733 to honour the Virgin Mary.

References

External links
 Technical paper about the dome